There are various systems of romanization of the Armenian alphabet.

Transliteration systems

Hübschmann-Meillet (1913) 
In linguistic literature on Classical Armenian, the commonly used transliteration is that of Hübschmann-Meillet (1913). It uses a combining dot above mark U+0307 to express the aspirates, ṫ, cḣ, č̇, ṗ, k̇.  Some documents were published using a similar Latin dasia diacritic U+0314, a turned comma combining above the letter, which is easier to distinguish visually in t̔, ch̔, č̔, p̔, k̔.

However, the correct support of these combining diacritics has been poor for long in the past and was not very common on many usual applications and computer fonts or rendering systems, so some documents have been published using, as possible fallbacks, their spacing variants such as the modifier letter dot above ˙ U+02D9 written after the letter instead of above it, or the turned comma  U+02BB written after the letter instead of above it — or sometimes the spacing Greek spiritus asper ῾ U+1FFE, or the spacing grave accent ˋ U+02CB even if it is too flat, or even the ASCII backquote ` U+0060, or the ASCII apostrophe-quote ' U+0027 when there was no confusion possible.

But the preferred character today is the modifier letter left half-ring ʿ U+02BF, or the modifier letter  U+02BB or  U+02BD, which is the spacing variant of the dasia diacritic (it is also historically a correct adaptation to the Latin script of the Greek spiritus asper, see rough breathing) with the advantage of having excellent support in many Latin fonts because it is also a simple reversed.

Also, some ambiguities were not solved to work with modern vernacular Armenian, which has two dialects, both using two possible orthographies (besides, the modern orthography is used for Classical Armenian in modern publications).

BGN/PCGN (1981) 
BGN/PCGN romanization (1981) uses a right single quotation mark to express aspirates, t’, ch’, ts’, p’, k’, the opposite of the original rough breathing diacritic.

This romanization was taken up by ISO (1996) and is considered obsolete. This system is a loose transcription and is not reversible (without using dictionary lookup), notably for single Armenian letters romanized into digraphs (these non-reversible, or ambiguous romanizations are shown in a red cell in the table below).

Some Armenian letters have several romanizations, depending on their context:
 the Armenian vowel letter Ե/ե should be romanized as ye initially or after the vowel characters Ե/ե, Է/է, Ը/ը, Ի/ի, Ո/ո, ՈՒ/ու and Օ/օ; in all other cases it should be romanized as e;
 the Armenian vowel letter Ո/ո should be romanized as vo initially, except in the word եո where it should be romanized as ov; in all other cases it should be romanized as o;
 the Armenian consonant letter և should be romanized yev initially, in isolation or after the vowel characters Ե/ե, Է/է, Ը/ը, Ի/ի, Ո/ո, ՈՒ/ու and Օ/օ; in all other cases it should be romanized as ev.

ISO 9985 (1996) 
ISO 9985 (1996) is the international standard for transliteration of the modern Armenian alphabet. Like with the BGN/PCGN romanization, the right single quotation mark is used to denote most of the aspirates.

This system is reversible because it avoids the use of digraphs and returns to the Hübschmann-Meillet (however some diacritics for vowels are also modified).

The aspirate series is not treated consistently in ISO 9985: while p, t, c, k are romanized with an apostrophe-like mark, aspirated չ č is not, and instead its unaspirated counterpart ճ is transcribed č̣ with an underdot appearing nowhere else in the system.  Note that in this scheme, č (signifying չ) collides with the Hübschmann-Meillet transliteration (where it signifies ճ).

This system is recommended for international bibliographic text interchange (it is also the base of simplified romanizations found to localize the Armenian toponomy of for transliterating human names), where it works very well with the common ISO/IEC 8859-2 Latin encoding used in Central Europe.

ALA-LC (1997) 
ALA-LC romanization (1997) is largely compatible with BGN/PCGN, but returns to expressing aspirates with a left single quotation mark (in fact the modifier letter left half-ring ʿ U+02BF, US-MARC hexadecimal code B0, that is also used to denote ayin in Arabic, so some documents may contain either the preferred left half-ring, or sometimes the ASCII backquote ` U+0060).

This standard changes the transliteration scheme used between Classical/Eastern Armenian and Western Armenian for the Armenian consonants represented by swapping the pairs b vs. p, g vs. k, d vs. t, dz vs. ts and ch vs. j.

In all cases, and to make this romanization less ambiguous and reversible,
 a soft sign (a prime, US-MARC hexadecimal code A7) is inserted between two separate letters that would otherwise be interpreted as a digraph (in red in the table below); no prime is present in the middle of romanized digraphs zh, kh, ts, dz, gh and ch representing a single Armenian letter;
 with the Classical Armenian orthography only, the vowel represented by e will be represented by y instead, when it is at the initial position in a name and followed by another vowel; this difficulty has disappeared in modern Armenian with the reformed orthography that changed the original Armenian letter in such case;
 with the Classical Armenian orthography only, the vowel represented by y will be represented by h instead, when it is at the initial position of a word or of a radical in a compound word; this difficulty has disappeared in modern Armenian with the reformed orthography that changed the original Armenian letter in such case.

ASCII-only input methods 
On various Armenian websites, non-standard transliterators have appeared, which allows inputting modern Western or Eastern Armenian text using ASCII-only characters. It is not a proper transliterator but can be convenient for users that don't have Armenian keyboards.

Despite these input methods being commonly used, they do not adhere to any approved international or Armenian standard, so they are not recommended for the romanization of Armenian. Note that the input methods recognize the Latin digraphs zh, dz, gh, tw, sh, vo, ch, rr for Classic or Eastern Armenian, and zh, dz, tz, gh, vo, ch, rr for Western Armenian, but offer no way to disambiguate words where the digraphs should not be recognized.

Some Armenian letters are entered as Latin digraphs, and may also be followed by the input of an ASCII single quote (which acts as the only letter modifier recognized) but this quote does not always mean that the intended Armenian letter should be aspirated (this may be the reverse for the input ch'), it is also used as a vowel modifier. Due to ambiguities, texts must be corrected by entering an intermediate dummy character before entering the second Latin letter or quote, then removing the dummy character, so that the automatic input converter keeps the Armenian letters distinct.

Transliteration tables 
Some Armenian letters have very different phonetic sounds between Classical or Eastern Armenian and Western Armenian, so that the usage of Armenian letters is different between the two sub-branches of the language.

This is made visible in the table below by coloring transliterations specific to Classical or Eastern Armenian on green background, and those for Western Armenian on blue background. Other letters are transliterated independently of the language branch. However, cells with red background contain transliterations that are context dependent (and may in some cases create ambiguities, only the ISO 9985 and Hübschmann-Meillet romanizations do not use any context-dependant ambiguous digraphs for transcribing simple Armenian letters that are not ligatures, but the former is inconsistent with its representation of aspirated consonants and incompatible with all other systems for a pair of letters).

Note that in the table above, the last two columns refer to digraphs, not isolated letters (however, they are considered letters in the Reformed orthography). However the last column displays the ligature that is used in the Classical orthography only as an isolated symbol for the short Armenian word ew (meaning and) and its derivations in a way similar to the ampersand (&) in the Latin script (in the Reformed orthography, it is also used at the middle and the end of words instead of եվ); the same transliteration to ew (classical Armenian) or ev (reformed orthography) will be used for the letters this ligature represents, when they are used as digraphs: it used to refer to the w consonant, now it refers to the v consonant.

Armenian script also uses some other digraphs that are often written as optional ligatures, in lowercase only (five of them are encoded in Unicode only for full roundtrip compatibility with some legacy encodings); when present, these ligatures (which are purely typographic and carry no semantic distinction in normal Armenian texts) must be romanized by decomposing their component letters.

See also 
 Armenian language
 Classical Armenian
 Western Armenian
 Eastern Armenian
 Armenian alphabet
 Classical Armenian orthography
 Armenian orthography reform
 List of ISO romanizations

References

Further reading
 Antoine Meillet and Heinrich Hübschmann, Altarmenisches Elementarbuch, Heidelberg, 1913 (2nd edition, 1980).

External links 
 Armenian Transliteration Converter Supports both Eastern and Western pronunciations of Armenian, includes a spell checker.
 Transliteration of Armenian by Thomas T. Pedersen, in KNAB (Kohanimeandmebaas, Place Names Database) of Eesti Keele Instituut (Institute of the Estonian Language).
 A ready macro for Visual Basic in Microsoft Word text editor, allowing to automatically replace the Armenian letters to Latin script, using the Versatile option above for the Eastern-Armenian language.

 
Armenian alphabet
Armenian
ISO standards